The Göttingen Faculty of Theology is the divinity school at the University of Göttingen, officially denominated the "United Theological Departments" but commonly referred to as the "Theological Faculty". It was instituted at the foundation of the University, in 1737, along with the three other original faculties of Law, Medicine, and Philosophy (or Arts). Over the centuries, the Göttingen Faculty of Theology has been home to many influential scholars and movements, including the rise of historical criticism, Ritschlianism, the History of Religions School, and Dialectical Theology. Its members were also involved in the Göttingen School of History.

A Protestant institution, the Theologische Fakultät has long consisted of the five traditional disciplines of theology—Old Testament Studies, New Testament Studies, Church History, Systematic Theology, and Practical Theology—but now includes Religious Studies as well. The faculty has numerous projects, programs, and partnerships with other centers, departments, and faculties across the University as well as the Göttingen Graduate School of Humanities and the Göttingen Academy of Sciences and Humanities.

Besides the Göttingen State and University Library—which stands across from the Faculty's home, the Theologicum—the Faculty of Theology maintains its own specialist library, with current holdings of 170,000 volumes and 250 periodicals.

Academics 
The Faculty of Theology educates University students at all levels, for bachelor's, master's, and doctoral degrees. (Historically, the Doctor of Theology was considered the highest academic rank, and at the University's foundation, it was mostly reserved for honorary purposes.) It also trains ordinands for the Confederation of Protestant Churches in Lower Saxony. To support its students, the Faculty of Theology runs the Theologisches Stift. This residential college—initiated by Isaak August Dorner modelled on the Tübinger Stift—has its origins in an earlier theological seminary and numbers among the University's oldest institutions.

Departments 

The Faculty is divided into six primary departments, with their own dedicated chairs, researchers, lecturers, and support staff.
 Old Testament Studies
 New Testament Studies
 Church History
 Systematic Theology
 Practical Theology
 Religious Studies

Special Research Sections 
In addition, the Göttingen Faculty of Theology houses other sections for specialized research. These sections often cut across departments within the faculty and involve other faculties as well. They include, among others, the following: 
 Institute for Research on Qumran 
 Institute for Jewish Studies 
 Karl Barth Research Center 
 Archive for the History of Relions School 
 Division for Hellenistic Religious History

Major Research Projects 
Scholars at the Göttingen Faculty of Theology have launched substantial research undertakings, often in partnership with other institutions. Larger and longer-running ones among them include the following:
 Septuaginta-Unternehmen (1908–2015): a critical edition of the Septuagint (i.e., the Greek translation of the Hebrew Bible), launched by Alfred Rahlfs in cooperation with the Göttingen Academy of Sciences and Humanities
 Qumran-Wörterbuch: a dictionary of the Dead Sea Scrolls, directed by Reinhard Gregor Kratz in collaboration with the Göttingen Academy of Sciences and Humanities
 Critical Edition of the Old Testament in Coptic language together with the Göttingen Academy of Sciences and Humanities
 Götterbilder - Gottesbilder - Weltbilder: Polytheismus und Monotheismus in der Welt der Antike (2004–2012): an interdisciplinary graduate school or "research training group" (Graduiertenkolleg) for religion in the ancient world, directed by Hermann Spieckermann through support from the Deutsche Forschungsgemeinschaft
 "Early Jewish Monotheisms" (2009–2014): a research group on the history of Judaism, led by Nathan MacDonald and supported by the Sofia Kovalevskaya Award of the Alexander von Humboldt Foundation

Lecture Series 
 Julius-Wellhausen-Vorlesung—a lecture series delivered by distinguished scholars—held in conjunction with the Göttingen Centrum Orbis Orientalis et Occidentalis

People

Notable Members 
The following are notable past and present senior associates of the Faculty of Theology:

Past 

 Karl Barth
 Günther Bornkamm
 Hans Conzelmann
 Heinrich Ewald
 Ernst Käsemann
 Johann David Michaelis
 Nathan MacDonald
 Carl Mirbt
 Bernd Moeller
 Johann Lorenz von Mosheim
 Alfred Rahlfs
 Albrecht Ritschl
 Rudolf Smend
 Paul Tschackert
 Gerhard von Rad
 Walther Zimmerli
 Gerd Lüdemann

Present 
 Reinhard Gregor Kratz

 Hermann Spieckermann
 Andreas Grünschloß

Notable Students 
The following are notable students of the Faculty of Theology:

 Wilhelm Bousset
 Albert Eichhorn
 Richard Gaffin
 Hermann Gunkel
 Wilhelm Heitmüller
 Jürgen Moltmann
 Rudolf Otto
 Otto Ritschl
 Ernst Troeltsch
 Johannes Weiss
 Julius Wellhausen
 Paul Wernle
 William Wrede
 Jacob L. Wright

Bibliography 
 Bernd Moeller, ed. Theologie in Göttingen. Eine Vorlesungsreihe. Göttingen: Vandenhoeck & Ruprecht, 1987.
 Gerd Lüdemann, ed. Die “Religionsgeschichtliche Schule”. Facetten eines theologischen Umbruchs. Studien und Texte zur Religionsgeschichtlichen Schule 1. Frankfurt: Peter Lang, 1996.
 Gerd Lüdemann and Martin Schröder, eds. Die Religionsgeschichtliche Schule in Göttingen. Eine Dokumentation. Göttingen: Vandenhoeck & Ruprecht, 1987. 
 Kurt Meier. Die theologischen Fakultäten im Dritten Reich. Berlin: Walter de Gruyter, 1996.
 Hans-Günther Schotter, ed. Die Geschichte der Verfassung und der Fachbereiche der Georg-August-Universität zu Göttingen. Göttingen: Vandenhoeck & Ruprecht, 1994.
 Bernd Schröder and Heiko Wojtkowiak, eds. Stiftsgeschichte(n). 250 Jahre Theologisches Stift der Universität Göttingen (1765–2015). Göttingen: Vandenhoeck & Ruprecht, 2015.
 Leonore Siegele-Wenschkewitz and Carsten Nicolaisen, eds. Theologische Fakultäten im Nationalsozialismus. Göttingen: Vandenhoeck & Ruprecht, 1993.
 Rudolf Smend. "Eine Fakultät in kritischer Zeit. Die Göttinger Theologie zwischen 1930 und 1950." In idem, Zwischen Mose und Karl Barth. Akademische Vorträge. Tübingen: Mohr Siebeck, 2009.
 Jürgen von Stackelberg, ed. Zur geistigen Situation der Zeit der Göttinger Universitätsgründung, 1737. Eine Vortragsreihe aus Anlass des 250jährigen Bestehens der Georgia Augusta. Göttingen: Vandenhoeck & Ruprecht, 1988.

References

External links
 Faulty of Theology Website http://www.uni-goettingen.de/de/sh/19855.html
 University of Göttingen Website https://www.uni-goettingen.de/en/1.html

University of Göttingen
Protestant seminaries and theological colleges